Mapumai Swamp is the largest wetland in the Cook Islands. It is located in the north of Atiu, on the edge of the volcanic area. Its flora is dominated by Cladium, giant bullrush, and Azolla filiculoides.

Notes

Atiu
Landforms of the Cook Islands
Swamps of Oceania